

Winners and nominees

1980s

1990s

2000s

Records  
 Most awarded actors: Anabel Ferreira and Jorge Ortiz de Pinedo, 5 times.
 Most awarded actress (ever winner): Anabel Ferreira, 5 times.
 Most nominated actor: Jorge Ortiz de Pinedo with 6 nominations.
 Most nominated actress without a win: Florinda Meza with 3 nominations.
 Youngest winner: María Elena Saldaña, 23 years old.
 Youngest nominee: María Antonieta de las Nieves, 36 years old.
 Oldest winner: Roberto Gómez Bolaños, 62 years old.
 Oldest nominees: Raúl "Chato" Padilla, 69 years old.
 Actress winning after short time: Anabel Ferreira (1989, 1990, 1991, 1992 and 1993), 5 consecutive years.
 Actress winning after long time: Maribel Fernández by (La carabina de Ambrosio, 1986) and (Hasta que la muerte nos separe, 1994), 8 years difference.
Foreign winning actor: Pompín Iglesias from Colombia.

References

External links 
TVyNovelas at esmas.com
TVyNovelas Awards at the univision.com

Comedic Performance
Comedic Performance
Comedic Performance
Awards established in 1983
Awards disestablished in 2007